The Watch the Throne Tour was a co-headlining concert tour by American rappers Jay-Z and Kanye West that began on October 28, 2011 in Atlanta and continued until June 22, 2012 with its final show scheduled in Birmingham. Originally scheduled for 23 performances, the tour was expanded to 34 performances in North America due to heavy demand for tickets; 29 shows were confirmed in the United States with 5 shows in Canada. Following massive success in the United States and Canada, Jay-Z & Kanye West announced the European leg of the tour on February 21, 2012 which featured 23 performances, bringing the number of shows to 57 at the time.

Following the Glow in the Dark Tour, it marks West's first concert tour after four years, excluding his ultimately cancelled tour, Fame Kills with Lady Gaga. It follows Jay-Z's opening act for U2 at the U2 360° Tour and his The Home & Home Tour with Eminem. The concert, which has no opening act of its own, is in support of West and Jay-Z's 2011 album, Watch the Throne, with most of the album's track-list performed, such as singles "Otis", "Lift Off", "Niggas in Paris" and concert opener "H•A•M". Additional West singles like "Gold Digger", "Stronger", "Heartless" and "All of the Lights" and Jay-Z singles like "Izzo (H.O.V.A.)", "99 Problems", "Run This Town", and "Empire State of Mind" are also performed.

The critical and box office performance of the tour received rave reviews, with critics praising the production value, the elaborate stage design, and the large string of successful singles featured. The tour had very little promotion before its premiere, with the exception being behind-the-scene concert footage sponsored by Voyr. It grossed $48.3 million in North America in 2011 and $25.4 million in Europe in 2012.

Synopsis
The show begins with West and Jay-Z "emerging on two cube-shaped mini stages to the operatic sounds of "H•A•M". Following that, "Who Gon Stop Me" is the next song, with "Otis" being performed with "a Givenchy – designed American flag flashing on the stage's main screens" after an extended introduction using "Try a Little Tenderness" by Otis Redding. Afterwards, Kanye leaves the stage, and Jay-Z performs songs like "Where I'm From" and "Empire State of Mind", encouraging the audience to sing along. Kanye returns to the stage afterwards, performing his own songs like "Power", "Touch the Sky", and "Gold Digger", eventually with the two of them performing songs together, like "Run This Town", "Monster" and the remix of "Diamonds from Sierra Leone", where Jay-Z repeatedly told the crowd to "put your diamonds up", the sign for Roc Nation.

Mixing hits from both artists discographies, like "Can't Tell Me Nothing", "Good Life", "Izzo (H.O.V.A.)" and "99 Problems", the show then segues into West performing "Runaway" and "Heartless", which has been described as "emotional highlight of the show". The most energetic part of the show has been reported to be during "Niggas in Paris", with "the track's Will Ferrell intro ("We're gonna skate to one song and one song only") brought on the moment that everyone was waiting for." "Niggas in Paris" was originally performed three times in a row, but as the tour progressed, the song was regularly performed up to ten times in succession, with the record being 11 times in Paris, France. Following other Watch the Throne tracks like "No Church in the Wild" and "Lift Off", the show ends with "Encore" and an inspirational rendition of "Made in America", complete with images of Martin Luther King Jr. and "sweet brother" Malcolm X flashing on the big screen. USA Today described the stage design:

This show was visually spectacular. There was a main, T-shaped stage where both entertainers performed together, and also two cube-shaped mini stages, one at each end of the arena, that rose and lowered at various points during the show. West and Jay-Z performed separately on these cubes, which showed various images (a snarling Rottweiler, a swimming shark) at different points of the show. Fireballs the size of car tires shot from the floor toward the ceiling during some performances. Two large video screens behind the main stage showed appropriate images during the performances; a virtually non-stop laser light show added to the oomph factor.

Reception

Critical reception towards the tour was positive. MTV News gave the opening show a good review, writing "While the WTT album has been noted for its opulent displays of wealth, Hov and Yeezy's show will be marked by the duo's overabundance of hit records." USA Today praised the duo's ability to get the audience excited, stating "at one point, as Jay-Z and West performed Niggas in Paris from their new hit CD, "Watch the Throne", West exhorted the audience to "Bounce! Bounce!" The resulting stomping had Philips Arena rocking and shaking in a way that it hasn't for the Hawks in a long time." Rap-Up mused "it was a crowning moment for Jay-Z and Kanye West as they kicked off the Watch the Throne tour to a packed house at Philips Arena in Atlanta on Friday night. The hip-hop kings, collectively known as The Throne, opened the most anticipated hip-hop tour of the year with a bang." Idolator stated that the tour featured "an epic set list that featured selections from each artist's own behemoth catalog of hits as well as their Watch The Throne collaborations." The tour has grossed $48.3 million so far by the end of 2011, making it the highest grossing hip-hop tour and the eighth highest-grossing tour of 2011. In 2017,  Rolling Stone listed it in its list of "The 50 Greatest Concerts of the Last 50 Years". In 2019, Consequence of Sound named it the third best tour of the 2010s. The tour won best live stage show at the 2012 International Laser Display Association Awards  

In a 2011 interview with Rolling Stone, comedian Chris Rock said;
"This might be the greatest show I ever saw. It's the equivalent of the Billy Joel-Elton John tour, but if they did it in 1979, when the songs were hot!"

Setlists

North America
"H•A•M"
"Who Gon Stop Me"
"Otis"
"Welcome to the Jungle"
"Gotta Have It"
"Where I'm From"
"Nigga What, Nigga Who (Originator 99)"
"Can't Tell Me Nothing"
"Jesus Walks"
"All Falls Down"
"Diamonds from Sierra Leone"
"Public Service Announcement"
"U Don't Know"
"Run This Town"
"Monster"
"Power"
"Murder to Excellence"
"New Day"
"Hard Knock Life (Ghetto Anthem)"
"Izzo (H.O.V.A.)"
"Good Life"
"Empire State of Mind"
"Runaway"
"Heartless"
"Stronger"
"On to the Next One"
"Dirt off Your Shoulder"
"Touch the Sky"
"All of the Lights"
"Big Pimpin'"
"Gold Digger"
"99 Problems"
"No Church in the Wild"
"Lift Off"
"Niggas in Paris" (several times)
Encore

Europe
"H•A•M"
"Who Gon Stop Me"
"Otis"
"Welcome to the Jungle"
"Gotta Have It"
"Where I'm From"
"Nigga What, Nigga Who (Originator 99)"
"Can't Tell Me Nothing"
"All Falls Down"
"Flashing Lights"
"Jesus Walks"
"Diamonds from Sierra Leone"(Remix)
"Public Service Announcement"
"U Don't Know"
"Run This Town"
"Monster"
"Power"
"New Day"
"Hard Knock Life (Ghetto Anthem)"
"Izzo (H.O.V.A.)"
"Empire State of Mind"
"Runaway"
"Heartless"
"Stronger"
"On to the Next One"
"Dirt off Your Shoulder"
"I Just Wanna Love U"
"That's My Bitch"
"Good Life"
"Touch the Sky"
"All of the Lights"
"Big Pimpin'"
"Gold Digger"
"99 Problems"
"No Church in the Wild"
"Lift Off"
Niggas in Paris
Encore

Tour dates

Box office score data

Members 
The following individuals were members of the Watch The Throne tour:

Mike Dean
Noah Goldstein
Che Pope 
Renelou Padora 
Don C 
Ibn Jasper 
Izvor Zivkovic 
Virgil Abloh
Alex Rosenberg
Matthew Williams 
Elon Rutberg 
Fabien Montique
Tracey Mills
Caitlyn Carpenter
Hannah Christian
Lara Holmes
Ricky Anderson
Sakiya Sandifer 
Justin Saunders 
Drew Goodman

Credits
Creative Direction & Set Design: Kanye West & Es Devlin 
Additional Set Design: Bruce Rodgers 
Lighting Designer: Nick Whitehouse & John McGuire 
Video Designer: Geodezik

Notes
London hosted the most Watch the Throne concerts (5), followed by Los Angeles and Paris (both 3).
Rihanna made a special guest appearance on the third date (20 May) in London, performing her vocals on "Run This Town" and "All of the Lights". She is the only artist to have made a guest appearance on the tour.
During the last date in London (22 May), Kanye West performed "Mercy" live for the first time.
During the last date in Paris (18 June), at the 'Palais Omnisports de Bercy', they set a record, performing "Niggas in Paris" 12 times during approximately one hour.
During the last date in Birmingham (22 June), Beyoncé and Kim Kardashian participated in the crowd mosh pit during the performance of "Niggas in Paris".

References

Kanye West concert tours
2011 concert tours
2012 concert tours
Jay-Z concert tours
Co-headlining concert tours
Concerts at Malmö Arena